Barrie Williams (23 September 1937 – 23 April 2018) was a Welsh football coach. He managed Sutton United during the 1980s and the England women's team during 1991. In January 1989, Williams led Sutton United, of the Football Conference, to a notable FA Cup win over top-division Coventry City. A teacher of English Literature by profession, Williams was known for quoting Shakespeare and Kipling, as well as smoking a pipe. 
Williams took charge of Hendon for their 1992–93 Isthmian League campaign.

Williams later emigrated to Spain, where he died on 23 April 2018, aged 80.

References 

1937 births
2018 deaths
Welsh football managers
Welsh expatriate sportspeople in Spain
Sutton United F.C. managers
England women's national football team managers
Hendon F.C. managers
Welsh schoolteachers
Sportspeople from Carmarthen